Miloš Pantović (born 24 August 2002) is a Serbian football winger who plays for Voždovac.

International career
Pantović made his debut for Serbia national football team on 25 January 2023 in a friendly match against USA. Serbia won the game 2 – 1, with Pantović coming on in the second half as a substitute.

Career statistics

International

References

External links
 
 

2002 births
Living people
Association football wingers
Serbian footballers
Serbian First League players
Serbian SuperLiga players
Red Star Belgrade footballers
RFK Grafičar Beograd players
FK Voždovac players
Serbia under-21 international footballers
Serbia international footballers